Philesiaceae is a family of flowering plants, including two genera, each with a single species. The members of the family are woody shrubs or vines endemic to southern Chile.

The APG III system, of 2009 (unchanged from the APG II system of 2003 and the APG system, of 1998) places the family in the order Liliales, in the clade monocots. They are a sister to the family Ripogonaceae which is endemic to Australia, New Zealand and New Guinea.

Genera
Lapageria Ruiz & Pavon
Philesia Comm. ex Jussieu

References

External links
Philesiaceae in L. Watson and M.J. Dallwitz (1992 onwards). The families of flowering plants: descriptions, illustrations, identification, information retrieval. Version: 9 March 2006. http://delta-intkey.com 
NCBI Taxonomy Browser
links at CSDL, Texas

Liliales
Liliales families